Nils Taki Claesson (born 1958 in Stockholm), is an artist, filmmaker, author, and artistic researcher at the Royal Institute of Art in Stockholm.

Life
Claesson received his PhD in fine arts from the Film and Media Department at Stockholm University of the Arts with the dissertation The Ghost Machine: Seven changes and transitions – animation processes in animated film.

Claesson joined the newspaper ETC 1979–1984, where he was a co-owner for a while. He had acting roles in two films in the 1980s, among other things in Stig Larsson's film Ängel, but he has mainly directed, written manuscript and worked with animated films and radio documentaries. He has been working with digital media since the mid-1990s, and has played a central role in the development of Swedish digital art through his work for the artistic creative space for art and computing (CRAC), where he was chairman from 2002 to 2005. In connection with this, he established a broad international network, and organized international exhibitions such as "Money, a comment on the new economy”, as well as seminars and exchange projects with other media labs in Europe. He also led the network for media labs in Norway, Pnek 2001–2002, and was one of the artists behind the Association for Temporary Art [a: t] a platform for art online (1997–2007). He has also been active in the artist-driven galleries Tegen2 and ID:I gallery. Claesson has exhibited extensively in Sweden and Europe.

The book The Blueberry Machine, published 2009, is about his father Stig Claesson.

Radio and film
 Directing
2016 Love and solidarity
2012 sliN
2006 Snow – from the white you remember
1998 The little horror movie package
1995 Chameleon
1995 People’s movies
1995 The world's longest Christmas Eve
1994 Three minutes each summer
1993 Moon face
1986 Man who shaves at Seine
1984 The one looking away is a rat

 Manuscripts
2006 Snow – from the white you remember 
1995 Chameleon
1993 Moon face

 Roles
1989 Angel
1987 The Awakening

Books, book chapters and articles
 2017 Seven changes and transitions – artistic processeses in animated movies
 2016  We are not yet seeing the results of artistic research
 2014 When photographs were pictures, not art
 2013 The lab: 12 voices about laboratories and libraries
 2012  sliN, Performing the Common
 2012 The road to Husby
 2012 Introduction to the animated moving image
 2009 The blueberry machine
 2002 Money
 1998 The family and everything about the meaning of life
 1985 I and Angela Davis

Art projects
 2018 You have no choice
 2018 Books no one reads
 2015 Lost and found in translation
 2016 A train to Spain
 2013 The Shadow machine
 2012 sliN, Performing the common
 2009 The Contract
 2007 Body in the net
 2007 SWIZHE 
 2006 Video-Dnevnik
 2006 Re-approaching new media, Ram 7
 2005 Re:production
 2005 40 years of victory
 2004 Solidarity without heroes
 2002 The Pudas Box
 2002 Money, an exhibition about the new economy
 2001 The Public Opinion
 2000 The Art of organising
 2000 The Minsk connection
 2000 Speak to Ingmar
 1998 "Say Voff"
 1998 Time Viewers
 1998 Travel to countries that are no longer available
 1998 Opens in a thousand years – a message to the future from Vallhornsgatan in Rågsved, Port
 1997 Movies of the memory (Minnets filmer)

References

1958 births
Living people
Swedish filmmakers
20th-century Swedish male artists
21st-century Swedish male artists
Swedish male writers